The first Johnson ministry began on 24 July 2019 when Queen Elizabeth II invited Boris Johnson to form a new administration, following the resignation of the predecessor Prime Minister Theresa May. May had resigned as Leader of the Conservative Party on 7 June 2019; Johnson was elected as her successor on 23 July 2019. The Johnson ministry was formed from the 57th Parliament of the United Kingdom, as a Conservative minority government. It lost its working majority on 3 September 2019 when Tory MP Dr Phillip Lee crossed the floor to the Liberal Democrats. An election was called for 12 December 2019, which led to the formation of a Conservative majority government, the second Johnson ministry.

History
Theresa May announced on 24 May 2019 that she would resign as Leader of the Conservative Party and therefore Prime Minister, after failing three times to secure passage through the House of Commons of her Withdrawal Agreement and Implementation Bill, which would have seen the United Kingdom leave the European Union. Her announcement also followed the Conservative Party's very poor showing in the 2019 European Parliament elections in the UK. Her resignation as Conservative leader took effect on 7 June 2019.

The former London Mayor and Foreign Secretary Boris Johnson was elected to succeed May on 23 July 2019. He was appointed Prime Minister on the following day by Queen Elizabeth II. Johnson inherited a minority government, supported by a confidence and supply agreement with the Democratic Unionist Party of Northern Ireland.

Johnson appointed his cabinet on 24 July 2019, describing it as a "Cabinet for modern Britain", with The Guardian branding it "an ethnically diverse but ideologically homogeneous statement of intent". While forming his government, Johnson dismissed 11 senior ministers and accepted the resignation of six others, a purge described by Johnson's ally Nigel Evans as "not so much a reshuffle as a summer's day massacre". The mass dismissal was the most extensive Cabinet reorganisation without a change in ruling party in postwar British political history, exceeding the seven Cabinet ministers dismissed in the "Night of the Long Knives" of 1962, and was dubbed the "Night of the Blond Knives" by The Sun.

Among other appointments, Johnson made Dominic Raab the First Secretary of State and Foreign Secretary, and appointed Sajid Javid and Priti Patel as Chancellor of the Exchequer and Home Secretary respectively. Johnson increased the number of ministers attending the Cabinet to 33, four more than had attended the May Cabinet. One quarter of those appointed were women, proportionally less than the May and Cameron ministries. The Cabinet set a new record for ethnic minority representation, with four secretaries of state and two additional ministers coming from minority backgrounds; 17% of the Cabinet were from BAME backgrounds, compared to 14% of the UK population. Nearly two-thirds of those appointed went to fee-paying schools, and almost half had attended Oxford or Cambridge universities. Johnson also created a new ministerial title to be held by himself, Minister for the Union, fulfilling a campaign pledge he had made in the leadership election.

Loss of majority and ministerial resignations

Johnson lost his working majority on 3 September 2019, when Dr Phillip Lee crossed the floor to join the Liberal Democrats. This was reduced further later the same day when 21 Conservative MPs had the whip removed after voting against the Government in order to enable Parliament to take control of the order paper and to debate a back bench bill designed to prevent a no-deal Brexit.

On 5 September 2019, Johnson's brother and Orpington MP Jo Johnson announced his intention to resign both his ministerial position and parliamentary seat, stating “In recent weeks I’ve been torn between family loyalty and the national interest — it’s an unresolvable tension & time for others to take on my roles as MP & Minister.” On 7 September 2019, Amber Rudd announced she was resigning as Secretary of State for Work and Pensions and Minister for Women and Equalities, and leaving the Conservative Party.

Amid an impasse in parliament over Brexit, an election was called for 12 December 2019 by virtue of the passage of the Early Parliamentary General Election Act 2019 on 31 October 2019. The Conservatives won a majority, leading to the formation of the second Johnson ministry on 16 December 2019.

Cabinet

July–December 2019

Changes
Jo Johnson quit the government on 5 September 2019 and said that he would resign as an MP. His spot in the cabinet was filled by Zac Goldsmith, who was made Minister of State at the Department for Environment, Food and Rural Affairs and at the Department for International Development on 10 September 2019.
Amber Rudd resigned from the cabinet and from the Conservative Party on 7 September 2019. She was replaced as Secretary of State for Work and Pensions by Therese Coffey on 8 September 2019, and as Minister for Women and Equalities by Liz Truss on 10 September 2019.
Alun Cairns resigned from his post of Welsh Secretary on 6 November 2019.

List of ministers

Prime Minister and Cabinet Office

Departments of State

Law officers

Parliament

Departures from the first Johnson ministry
This is a list of resignations from the first government formed by Prime Minister Boris Johnson. Since forming a government on 24 July 2019 after his appointment as Prime Minister, Johnson faced 4 resignations, including 2 cabinet ministers. This list omits sitting MPs who left the Conservative Party or had the whip withdrawn. It also discludes all ministers who resigned prior to Boris Johnson taking office as Prime Minister.

See also
Johnson cabinets, of Boris Johnson as Mayor of London
Second Johnson ministry

Notes

References

Ministry, first
2019 establishments in the United Kingdom
British ministries
Cabinets established in 2019
Cabinets disestablished in 2019
Ministries of Elizabeth II
2019 disestablishments in the United Kingdom
2019 in British politics